Reto Burgermeister (born September 7, 1975) is a Swiss cross-country skier who has competed since 1994. Competing in three Winter Olympics, he finished sixth in the 4 × 10 km relay at Nagano in 1998 overall and ninth in the 15 km at Salt Lake City in 2002.

Burgermeister's best finish at the FIS Nordic World Ski Championships was tenth in the 30 km event at Val di Fiemme in 2003. His best World Cup finish was second twice in Germany (2003: 15 km, 2004: 15 km + 15 km double pursuit).

Burgermeister earned sixteen individual victories in lesser events up to 30 km from 1998 to 2006.

Burgermeister retired in 2009 as he was very unsuccessful since 2001. He was a former member of the Ski Club am Bachtel, the largest cross-country skiclub in the region of Zurich.

Since 2011 Burgermeister works as a coach for Russian national cross-country skiing team with Alexander Legkov and Ilia Chernousov under his supervision.

Cross-country skiing results
All results are sourced from the International Ski Federation (FIS).

Olympic Games

World Championships

World Cup

Season standings

Individual podiums
 2 podiums – (2 )

References

External links

Official website 
Olympic 4 x 10 km relay results: 1936-2002 

1975 births
Cross-country skiers at the 1998 Winter Olympics
Cross-country skiers at the 2002 Winter Olympics
Cross-country skiers at the 2006 Winter Olympics
Living people
Swiss male cross-country skiers
Olympic cross-country skiers of Switzerland
Cross-country skiing coaches
Sportspeople from the canton of Zürich